The spot-crowned euphonia (Euphonia imitans) is a species of bird in the family Fringillidae.
It is found in Costa Rica and Panama.
Its natural habitats are subtropical or tropical moist lowland forest and heavily degraded former forest.

References

Euphonia
Birds of Costa Rica
Birds of Panama
Birds described in 1936
Taxonomy articles created by Polbot
Isthmian–Pacific moist forests